Raze was an American electronic dance music group by the multi-instrumentalist and producer Vaughan Mason. Raze also included the vocalists Keith Thompson, Wanda Sykes, Bobby Coleman and DJ Stephon Johnson.

Biography
Early releases included "Jack the Groove" and "Let the Music Move U", both in 1986. "Jack the Groove" was one of the first house music hits in the UK, entering the top 20 of the UK Singles Chart in January 1987. Along with Steve "Silk" Hurley's "Jack Your Body", a UK No. 1 the same month, it presaged the popularity of the genre in the UK in the late 1980s.

Raze hit No. 1 on the US Hot Dance Club Play chart in 1988 with "Break 4 Love" which also crossed over to urban radio stations, where it became a moderate hit. "Break 4 Love" hit No. 1 on the US dance chart again in 2001, when it was covered by Peter Rauhofer and the Pet Shop Boys, under the name the Collaboration.

In October 2004, "Break 4 Love" appeared in the popular video game Grand Theft Auto: San Andreas, playing on the house music radio station SF-UR.

Discography

Albums

Singles

† – Raze presents Doug Lazy
‡ – Raze featuring Lady J and Secretary of Entertainment
¶ – Raze/The Legend (montage of six Raze tracks, Champion Records UK)
^ – Raze presents ESTB

References

External links
 

American house music groups
Musical groups established in 1986